Ontological priority is a concept in philosophy where one entity is prior to another in being. This can be understood in terms of one entity depending on another entity, in terms of degrees being or in terms of linguistic reference.

Models of ontological priority

Dependence Model 
The most ubiquitous model is the dependence model of ontological priority which states that "A is prior to B" is true just in case B depends on A for its existence, as in the case where the color of a particular being depends on that being existing for the color-quality inhering in it to exist. An entity ontologically depends on another entity if the first entity cannot exist without the second entity. Ontologically independent entities, on the other hand, can exist all by themselves. For example, the surface of an apple cannot exist without the apple and so depends on it ontologically. Entities often characterized as ontologically dependent include properties, which depend on their bearers, and boundaries, which depend on the entity they demarcate from its surroundings.

"More Real" Model 
A model of ontological priority was developed by Justus Buchler in order to criticize it:Let us contrast a principle of ontological priority . . . with a principle of ontological parity. In terms of the latter, whatever is discriminated in any way . . . is a natural complex, and no complex is more 'real', more 'natural', more 'genuine', or more 'ultimate' than any other.This model states for something A to have ontological priority over something B, it is sufficient that A be more real than B. Thus, for a Platonist, the Forms are ontologically prior to sensible beings.

Strawson's Model 
P. F. Strawson holds that one type of particulars is ontological prior to another type of particulars if we cannot talk about the first type without referring to the second type. In Strawson's own ontology, physical objects are prior to all other particulars.

Related concepts

Truthmakers 
Truthmakers are entities that make a proposition true. For example, a dog being spotted makes the proposition "The dog is spotted" true. In such a relation, the truth of the proposition depends on the dogs being in a certain way for it to be true.

Substance 
Substances are generally understood to be things that do not depend on other things in order to exist. For example, in Aristotle's Categories, these are individuals, as individuals do not depend on their accidents in order to exist, while accidents do need their individuals in order to exist.

Grounding 
Grounding concerns in virtue of what else a proposition holds or some kind of thing is the way it is. This is articulated in the case of the Euthyphro dilemma. In the Euthyphro dialogue, Socrates asks Euthyphro, "Is the pious (τὸ ὅσιον) loved by the gods because it is pious, or is it pious because it is loved by the gods?" (10a). Epistemological foundationalists are similarly concerned with what propositions ground other propositions in the order of knowledge.

Notes

External links 
 Annotated bibliography on Ontological dependence

Ontology